Thomas Keogh was a Roman Catholic priest who became Bishop of Kildare and Leighlin. He was born in Gurteen, Skeoghvosteen, Graiguenamanagh, County Kilkenny in 1884.  In 1898, he enrolled in St. Josephs's Academy in Bagenalstown, operated by the De La Salle Brothers.  He studied for the priesthood in St. Patrick's College, Maynooth, and was ordained in 1909.

Bishop Keogh served on the staff of St. Patrick's, Carlow College (1911-1932) and as Vice-President (1921-1932), before being appointed parish priest of Portarlington, County Laois.

He was appointed Bishop of Kildare and Leighlin succeeding Dr. Matthew Cullen on 8 August, and consecrated 18 October 1936. He retired 25 September 1967, and died on 22 May 1969.

References

1884 births
1969 deaths
20th-century Roman Catholic bishops in Ireland
People from County Kilkenny
Alumni of St Patrick's College, Maynooth